Economic Programs in the United States are created for the purpose of helping the economy.

Economic Programs 
 Emergency Banking Act
 Economy Act
 Civilian Conservation Corps (CCC)
 Agriculture Adjustment Act (AAA)
 Tennessee Valley Authority (TVA)
 National Industrial Recovery Act (NIRA)
 Public Works Administration (PWA)
 Banking Act of 1933
 Federal Emergency Relief Administration (FERA)
 Federal Housing Administration (FHA)
 Civil Works Administration (CWA)
 Frazier-Lemke Farm Bankruptcy Act
 Federal Securities Act
 Glass–Steagall Act
 Federal Deposit Insurance Corporation (FDIC)
 National Housing Act
 Securities and Exchange Act (SEC)
 Indian Reorganization Act
 Home Owners' Loan Corporation (HOLC)
 Works Progress Administration (WPA)
 National Youth Administration

References 

Economy of the United States